Malik M'Baye (December 6, 1921 – 1993) was a French athlete who specialised in the triple jump.  M'Baye was born in Senegal and competed at the 1952 Summer Olympics.

References 

1921 births
1993 deaths
French male triple jumpers
Olympic athletes of France
French sportspeople of Senegalese descent
Athletes (track and field) at the 1952 Summer Olympics